Acridocephala pulchra is a species of beetle in the family Cerambycidae. It was described by Dillon and Dillon in 1959. It is known from Gabon.

References

Endemic fauna of Gabon
Acridocephala
Beetles described in 1959